Sion Michel, ACS is an American cinematographer based in Los Angeles, California, United States.

Michel is notable for his cinematography work with Dion Beebe in the films Memoirs of a Geisha (2005) and Collateral (2004). In addition, he has performed extensive cinematography work for various other films, especially Hong Kong films, as well as on different film and video projects with Steven Spielberg, Rob Marshall, Toyota, and Nike. He is also the founder of Mettafilm, a film production company.

Education 
Sion Michel was born in the United States, and has also spent much of his life in Australia. Michel obtained an M.A. in Cinematography from the Australian Film, Television and Radio School in 1992. He has been actively working in cinematography and photography since the 1990s.

Career 
Sion Michel has been an active cinematographer in the film industry since 1986.

Michel was Cinematographer for many notable films, including The Old Way, Sons of the Neon Night, Heartfall Arises, Shanghai Noir, and Like a Dream. Other production roles include cinematography work for the films Chasing Rabbits, WPPI 2013, and Laura Smiles.

Michel founded the film production company Mettafilm in 2005, where he currently serves as Director of Photography.

Sion Michel is also a member of the Australian Cinematographers Society (ACS).

Selected filmography 
Sion Michel's selected cinematography credits include:

Award nominations 
Sion Michel's cinematography work for Beyond The Fatal Shore, Tony Bennett: An American Classic, and Like a Dream have been nominated for various awards, including the Primetime Emmy Award and BAFTA Film Awards.

2002 – British Academy Award for Best Cinematography winner, for the BBC documentary series Beyond The Fatal Shore
2007 – Primetime Emmy Award for Outstanding Technical Direction, Camerawork, Video Control for a Limited Series, Movie, or Special nomination for Tony Bennett: An American Classic, directed by Rob Marshall.
2009 – 46th Golden Horse Awards Best Cinematography nomination for the feature Like a Dream, directed by Clara Law.

References

External links 

Penumbraman, B&W photography by Sion Michel

Living people
American cinematographers
BAFTA winners (people)
Australian Film Television and Radio School alumni
Year of birth missing (living people)